Cărpiniș may refer to several places in Romania:

Cărpiniș, a commune in Timiș County
 Cărpiniș, a village in Gârbova Commune, Alba County
 Cărpiniș, a village in Roșia Montană Commune, Alba County
 Cărpiniș, a village in Tărlungeni Commune, Brașov County
 Cărpiniș, a village in Crasna Commune, Gorj County
 Cărpiniș, a village in Simeria town, Hunedoara County
 Cărpiniș, a village in Copalnic-Mănăștur Commune, Mureș County
 Cărpiniș, a former village in Băneasa Commune, Constanța County

See also
 Cărpeniș, a village in Cepari Commune, Argeș County
 Cărpenișu, a village in Găiseni Commune, Giurgiu County
 Carpenul River (disambiguation)